Suthamalli is a village in the Udayarpalayam taluk of Ariyalur district, Tamil Nadu, India.

Demographics 

As per the 2001 census, Suthamalli had a total population of 3922 with 1932 males and 1990 females.

References 

Villages in Ariyalur district